Terendak Camp is a Malaysian Army military base located in Sungai Udang, Central Melaka District, Melaka, Malaysia. It belonged to the Commonwealth of Nations before being handed over to the Malaysian Armed Forces in 1970. It is right next to the Sungai Udang Camp.

History

Under the command of the Commonwealth of Nations 
The camp was constructed to house the 28th Commonwealth Infantry Brigade Group during their relocation from North Malaysia in 1959–1960. The newly built Sungai Udang Camp, which serves as the garrison for the Federation Regiment, was chosen as the location for the camp, dividing the Sungai Udang Camp in two. Construction began in 1957 and was partially funded by the governments of the United Kingdom, Australia, and New Zealand. The camp was originally known as Fort George before being renamed Terendak Garrison to correspond with the name of the hill on which the camp is located, Terendak Hill.

Construction of Terendak was started in June 1957 and was completed by 1964. Terendak covered an area of close to 1,500 acres with an additional training area of 3,500 acres.

28th Commonwealth Infantry Brigade occupancy started in late 1959 and by the mid-1960s the camp was fully occupied.

The Garrison consisted of:
 A Military Hospital
 A Transport Unit
 A Supply Depot (Foodstuffs, Fuel, Oil and Lubricants)
 A Education Centre
 A Civil Labour Unit
 A Hygiene and Malaria Control Unit
 Army Depot Police Detachment
 Barracks Services
 Commonwealth Brigade Units were accommodated in the following barrack areas:
 Brigade Headquarters – Martang-San Lines
 British Infantry Battalion – Imjin Lines
 Australian Infantry Battalion – Canberra Lines
 New Zealand Infantry Battalion – Wellington Lines
 Artillery Regiment – Solma-Ri Lines
 Field Engineer Squadron  – Kohima Lines
 Ordnance and Workshops – Arakan Lines
 Field Ambulance and Hospital – Mandalay Lines

Under the command of the Malaysian Armed Forces 
Terendak was handed over to the Malaysian army by the 28th Commonwealth Infantry Brigade on 28 March 1970, and has been occupied by the 1st Infantry Brigade ever since. The Terendak Camp later housed the 3rd Infantry Division, 10th Strategic Brigade (today known as the 10th Parachute Brigade), 32nd Regiment, Royal Artillery and the 94 Armed Forces Hospital.

Tenant units 
 3rd Infantry Division
 Division Headquarters
 1st Infantry Brigade
 10th Parachute Brigade
 Brigade Headquarters
 8th Battalion (Parachute), Royal Ranger
 9th Battalion (Parachute), Royal Malay
 17th Battalion (Parachute), Royal Malay
 1st Battalion (Parachute), Royal Artillery
 10th Squadron (Parachute), Royal Signal
 10th Squadron (Parachute), Royal Engineer
 361th Air Defence Battery (Parachute), Royal Artillery
 10th Field Workshop Company (Parachute), Royal Electric & Mechanical Engineer
 Medical Company (Parachute), Royal Medical and Dental
 Military Police Platoon (Parachute), Royal Military Police
 Pathfinder Company (Parachute)
 Support Company (Parachute)
 12th Squadron, Royal Engineer
 32nd Regiment, Royal Artillery
 94 Armed Forces Hospital

Facilities
Within Terendak Camp the following facilities were available:
 Four churches, including:
 St John's Protestant
 Corpus Christi Roman Catholic
 A mosque
 Four swimming pools
 Clubs and messes
 Shopping arcades
 A multipurpose hall
 Schools and kindergartens, including:
 MARA Junior Science College Terendak
 Slim High School (today known as SMK Kem Terendak)
 Mountbatten Primary School (today known as SK Kem Terendak 1)
 SK Kem Terendak 2
 Higher education college
 Institut Latihan Kesihatan Angkatan Tentera (INSAN) ('Armed Forces Medical Training Institute')
 Military hospital
 Two shooting ranges
 One federal government department responsible for the construction and maintenance of the camp

Terendak Garrison Cemetery

28th Commonwealth Infantry Brigade were actively engaged in the confrontation with Indonesia from 1963 until 1966. Some casualties from this campaign are buried in the Terendak Garrison Cemetery, additionally some Australian and New Zealand casualties from the Vietnam war are also interred at Terendak. Dependents who died of natural causes and the remains of personnel from earlier conflicts are also interred in the Terandak Garrison Cemetery.

There are now 323 non-World War servicemen and dependent burials in the Terendak Garrison Cemetery.

Repatriation of Australian war dead
On 2 June 2016, the remains of 32 persons interred at Terendak including several family members, plus one Vietnam War soldier interred at Kranji War Cemetery in Singapore, were repatriated to Australia, landing at RAAF Base Richmond on two Royal Australian Air Force C-17s. They had been dis-interred following agreement between the governments.

Repatriation of New Zealanders interred at Terendak
Between 1960 and August 2018, 18 New Zealanders who had died in Malaysia or South Vietnam were interred in the Terendak Garrison Cemetery. As the Terendak Garrison Cemetery is not a recognised Commonwealth Cemetery and the care and future of the New Zealand graves could not be guaranteed, there was a wish by New Zealand veterans groups and some families to have the remains repatriated to New Zealand for reburial. After considerable consultation and much resistance from the New Zealand Government, in 2017 an offer was finally made to the families of service personnel interred at Terendak to repatriate them at public expense as part of Project Te Auraki (The Return). Project Te Auraki is a New Zealand Government initiative to repatriate the 34 New Zealand service personnel interred in non-Commonwealth War Grave Commission-administrated cemeteries around the world.  On 21 August 2018, the 18 New Zealand servicemen interred at Terendak were repatriated to New Zealand, along with the 9 other service personnel and one child interred in various cemeteries in Malaysia and Singapore.

References

External links

 

Central Melaka District
New Zealand
Installations of the New Zealand Army
Military installations of Malaysia